The 1917–18 NC State Wolfpack men's basketball team represents North Carolina State University during the 1917–18 NCAA men's basketball season. The head coach was Harry Hartsell coaching the team in his first season.

Schedule

References

NC State Wolfpack men's basketball seasons
NC State
NC State Wolf
NC State Wolf